Chase Tramont (born November 9, 1979) is an American politician serving as a member of the Florida House of Representatives for the 30th district. He assumed office on November 8, 2022.

Early life and education 
Tramont was born in Daytona Beach, Florida. He played basketball at Mainland High School and earned two undergraduate degrees from Flagler College, the first in communications in 2002 and another in history education in 2007.

Career 
After graduating from college, Tramont became an ordained minister. He also worked as a history teacher at Spruce Creek High School before becoming a marketing manager at DME Delivers. Tramont was elected to the Florida House of Representatives in November 2022.

References 

Living people
1979 births
People from Daytona Beach, Florida
Flagler College alumni
Florida Republicans
Members of the Florida House of Representatives